Neerim North is a locality in Victoria, Australia, located on Neerim North Road, in the Shire of Baw Baw.

Neerim North Post Office opened on 25 September 1892 and closed in 1971.

References

Towns in Victoria (Australia)
Shire of Baw Baw